Surf punk may refer to:

 Surf punk (music genre), a genre of surf music and punk rock
 Surf punk (surf culture), a term for a territorial surfer
 Surf Punks, a 1976 pop punk band